Doug Dunville was a Canadian hockey player. He was born in Toronto, Ontario, on 22 August 1945. He played defence and shoots right.

Doug was a member of the Toronto Marlboros, an OHA team that was bolstered by OHA All-stars Bobby Orr, Serge Savard, Jean Pronovost, Derek Sanderson and Don Marcotte that played the Soviet National Team on December 14, 1965. The Marlboro/OHA All-Stars took a 3-1 into the third period but lost the game 4-3.
 
Doug also played on the Ontario Selects team (Mark Howe, Marty Howe, Paulin Bordeleau, Glenn Goldup of the Toronto Marlboros; Tom Planic, Doug Kelcher, Gary Milroy, Keith Wright, Grant Moore, Mike Draper, Claire Alexander, Jim Keon and Jean Levasseur (Orillia Terriers), Darryl Sly, Corby Adams and Pat Monahan (Barrie Flyers), Henry Hank Monteith (Oakville Oaks), Sonny Pennington (Galt Hornets) and Bob Munro (University of Toronto Blues) that played the Moscow Selects December 10, 1972.

After the Toronto Marlboros (1964–66), Doug played in the AHL, CPHL, WHL and OHA Senior leagues.

Career

 
Career Information as per Hockeydb.com

References

External links
 Doug Dunville Hockey Card - Tulsa Oilers 1966-67
 Roster including Doug Dunville for the OHA 1965 All-Star Team vs. Russia December 14, 1965
 Springfield Hockey Revolt Newspaper Article
 The Montreal Gazette - pg43 December 7, 1972 - Only One from Team Canada series on Touring Moscow Selects Roster
 Rochester Americans 1970-71 Team Photo

Canadian ice hockey defencemen
1945 births
Living people
Ice hockey people from Toronto